Max Crumpton (born 25 October 1993) is an English former rugby union player for Harlequins in Premiership Rugby.

He was a graduate of Saracens academy system where he progressed into the first-team squad. Crumpton spent time on loan with Plymouth Albion in the RFU Championship where he made four Championship appearances and featured in the British and Irish Cup. But it was cut short as he signed for Premiership rivals Harlequins on  a loan until the end of the 2013-14 season.

On 5 March 2014, Crumpton agreed a move to Bristol who play in the RFU Championship on a two-year contract from the 2014-15 season. but was extended for two further seasons until the end of the 2017-18 season. However, on 5 February 2018, Crumpton left Bristol by mutual consent to resign with Harlequins on a permanent deal until the end of the summer 2020.

Crumpton represented England through the age-group levels. He was selected for England U20s squad to take part in the 2012 IRB Junior World Championship in South Africa starting with a match against Italy U20s on 4 June 2012.

On 1 September 2018, Crumpton scored a try, on his competitive debut for Harlequins. Quin's beat Sale at home and Crumpton's second half try topped a brilliant competitive debut for Crumpton in Premiership Rugby, playing for Harlequins.

He was forced to retire through injury in June 2020.

References

External links
Harlequins Profile
Ultimate Rugby Profile
ESPN Profile

English rugby union players
1993 births
Living people
Saracens F.C. players
Bristol Bears players
Harlequin F.C. players
Rugby union hookers